Loch Watten is a loch in the River Wick drainage basin in Caithness, Scotland. The name is a tautology, consisting of the word "loch" (of Gaelic origin) and vatn, a Norse word meaning the very same, found in such names as "Þingvallavatn" and Myvatn in Iceland, and "Røssvatnet" and "Møsvatn" in Norway.

It is well known as a good fly fishing loch for brown trout with the local village Watten being located to the south

References

External links

Lochs of Highland (council area)
Sites of Special Scientific Interest in Caithness
Freshwater lochs of Scotland